Jones Springs is an unincorporated community in Berkeley County, West Virginia, United States. It is located on County Route 7 at its junction with County Route 7/8. The town, and several of its houses, lies on top of the numerous springs that give the community its name.

Located near Jones Springs is the Stuckey House, listed on the National Register of Historic Places in 1991.

References

Unincorporated communities in Berkeley County, West Virginia
Unincorporated communities in West Virginia